Chrysothemis is a genus of flowering plants in the family Gesneriaceae.

Species
Species include:
Chrysothemis dichroa Leeuwenb.
Chrysothemis friedrichsthaliana (Hanst.) H.E.Moore
Chrysothemis kuhlmannii Hoehne
Chrysothemis melittifolia (L.) M.M.Mora & J.L.Clark
Chrysothemis pulchella (Donn ex Sims) Decne.
Chrysothemis rupestris (Benth.) Leeuwenb.
Chrysothemis semiclausa (Hanst.) Leeuwenb.
Chrysothemis villosa (Benth.) Leeuwenb.

References

Gesnerioideae
Gesneriaceae genera
Taxa named by Joseph Decaisne